Matthew John King (born 25 February 1994) is an English cricketer. King is a right-handed batsman who bowls right-arm fast-medium. He was born at Basingstoke, Hampshire.

Educated at Fort Hill Community School, King made his debut for Hampshire in a List A match against Bangladesh A at the Rose Bowl in 2013. In a match which Hampshire won by 9 runs, King scored 8 runs in Hampshire's innings of 223, before he was dismissed by Robiul Islam, while with the ball he bowled three wicketless overs which conceded 9 runs.

References

External list
Matt King at ESPNcricinfo
Matt King at CricketArchive

1994 births
Living people
Cricketers from Basingstoke
English cricketers
Hampshire cricketers